Mizrahi feminism is a movement within Israeli feminism, which seeks to extricate Mizrahi women from the binary categories of Mizrahi-Ashkenazi and men-women. Mizrahi feminism is inspired by both Black feminism and Intersectional feminism, and seeks to bring about the liberation of women and social equality through recognition of the particular place Mizrahi women hold on the social map, and all the ways it affects Mizrahi women.

Concepts 
Some of the sociological research on ethnicity and gender in Israeli society describes and analyzes the ways in which Mizrahi Jews are excluded and marginalized by the Ashkenazi hegemony, as well as the ways in which women are excluded and marginalized by the patriarchal social structure, the labor market, and the state.

While Marxist feminism had previously linked the gender factor of oppression to that of class, it was Mizrahi feminism that pointed to the close relationship that exists in Israel between the class factor and the ethnic factor, and thus sought to connect more closely the sociological discourse about Mizrahim to the sociological discourse on women in Israel. The basic claim of Mizrahi feminism is that lower-class women find themselves positioned not only at the margins of the class ladder below men, but also below upper-class women. Therefore, the differences between groups of women are sometimes greater than the differences between the men and women from the same social group.

Mizrahi feminism seeks to distinguish between the category "Mizrahi women" and other categories within which they can be subsumed, as in the group "Mizrahim" and the group "women"; it also seeks to express the different and unique aspects of the identity of Mizrahi women. According to this movement, Mizrahi women possess a different life story than Ashkenazi women, one that includes subordination not only as the category of "women" but also as the category of "Mizrahim". In other words, the recognition of the unique point of intersectionality between the two.

Vicki Shiran, the founding mother of the Mizrahi feminism in Israel, wrote the following description:

Mizrahi feminist academic Ktzia Alon points out that though Mizrahi feminism opens up a rich area of discourse, it also arouses deep conflict, given that both the concept of "feminism" and the concept of "Mizrahi" are mired in controversy in Israel, which when put together is greatly intensified. Henriette Dahan Kalev, out three theoretical conclusions  of Mizrahi feminist analysis: "First, blindness, transparency, and exclusion of social categories are not only binary, occurring on the part of the hegemon towards the marginal groups. The phenomena of exclusion, displacement and transparency also exist between groups that are not hegemonic and within them. Marginalized and oppressed groups are not exempt from  being discriminatory themselves. Second, an understanding of the difference between transparency, exclusion and marginalization is essential to arriving at the solutions required for social change, whether through legislation or political struggle.Third, legal recognition and affirmative action are conditioned upon the existence of a political struggle to pave the way for public recognition that must precede legal recognition."

The Mizrahi feminist poet Esther Shekalim wrote:

History 
The 10th Feminist Conference, which took place between June 16–18, 1994 in Givat Haviva, was considered the defining event marking the birth of Mizrahi feminism in Israel.

In the 1980s and early 1990s, attempts were made to place Mizrahi feminism on the feminist agenda in Israel, in order to bring attention to the range of issues related to the unique life experiences of non-white women. The Mizrahi feminists claimed that Israeli feminism, which purports to represent all women, in fact represents only the interests of Ashkenazi women of the higher socio-economic classes, and ignores the unique problems of Mizrahi women. Mizrahi feminists also claimed that they experienced oppression and discrimination by white feminists in the course of their activities in the feminist movement. Mizrahi feminists demanded recognition of the discrimination they face on ethnic and class grounds within and outside the feminist movement, the formulation of a new feminist agenda that includes the needs and interests of Mizrahi women, and an egalitarian distribution of resources, control of decision-making and representation in the core organizations of the feminist movement, in which Ashkenazi feminists held exclusive control.

After failing in their attempts to get their issues on the feminist agenda and gain representation within the movement, a group of Mizrahi women, among them Ella Shohat, Tikva Levy, Mira Eliezer, Henriette Dahan-Kalev, Neta Amar, Vicki Shiran and others, initiated an action to "take the mic" at the 10th Feminist Conference in Givat Haviva in 1994. This time, they consciously chose a plan of actions that would ensure they could not be ignored or their issues tabled, even at the cost of open confrontation with the Ashkenazi feminists. The Mizrahi feminists engaged in angry protest at the event, and stormed the stage during the ideological debate, accusing Ashkenazi feminists of racism, oppression and exclusion, and began narrating and describing their experiences as Mizrahi in Israel. Among their stories, the women recounted how their names were taken from them and changed to Israeli names upon their arrival in Israel, the degrading treatment and racism that was and continues to be endemic to Israeli society and institutions, attitudes that pressured or forced them to deny and abandon their Arab culture and their languages of origin in order to integrate into Israeli society.

The stormy discussion that developed at the conference was conducted in high tones and with expressions of anger and outrage and the Mizrahi feminists, and the original discussion that was planned for the evening was wholly disrupted, displaced by an open battle between the participants, who were divided into two groups according to their positions on the Mizrahi issue. The Ashkenazi women, both as individuals and as representatives of such organizations as the Israel Women's Network and the Women's Voice, vehemently rejected the claims that they were partners in the oppression of Mizrahi feminists and claimed that the ethnic issue was irrelevant to feminism and that it was obsolete. The Mizrahi women, on the other hand, accused the Ashkenazi women of silencing them, and of blindness to the intersections of gender, ethnic and class identity of Mizrahi women and demanding Ashkenazi recognition that the Mizrahi and ethnic struggles also affect women's lives and should be integrated immediately into the Israeli feminist struggle.

The implications of the events of the conference on the Mizrahi feminist struggle 
After the events of the conference, and the refusal of Ashkenazi feminists to recognize the demands of Mizrahi feminists, some Mizrachi women felt that they had no choice but to separate themselves from the feminist movement and to act separately. They organized the first Mizrahi feminist conference, which took place in 1996, and dealt with the history of Mizrahi oppression in Israel, including issues from the participants' childhood and until the fateful feminist conference less than two years earlier. The social and political implications of dealing face-on with the oppression, discrimination, and humiliation that were and still are the lot of the Mizrahi women included the development of Mizrahi feminist consciousness among many Mizrahi women, who had never before seen feminism as a movement that was relevant to them. Later on, after the formulation of Mizrahi feminist theory and the cohesion of the group into a solidly independent movement, the Mizrahi feminist broadened their areas of activity, whether in long-recognized areas of feminism such as legislation, education and culture, or in the founding of uniquely Mizrahi feminist organizations, the primary example of which is Achoti - for Women in Israel, which was founded in 2000 and operates according to the principles of Mizrahi feminism, providing such services as forums and workshops, a community center, a publishing house, political action, education and more.

Issues in Mizrahi Feminism 
Similarly to any ethnic movement, Mizrahi feminism deals with the particular oppression occurring at the intersection between Mizrahi ethnicity and gender. Some of the particular issues facing Mizrahi women in Israel, and particularly setting Mizrahi feminism apart from Ashkenazi feminism, include:

 The historical placement of Mizrahi immigrants to Israel in the geographic periphery, with all that entails, such as economic hardship, lack of access to resources, channeling of the youth to trade schools and blue collar works, and so on.
 The ability to reconcile religion, or at least Jewish tradition, with feminism. Mizrahi culture retains a closer attachment to tradition than the hegemonic Ashkenazi culture, which is largely secular. Feminism in particular was imported to Israel in the 1970s by American immigrants, and therefore was especially unprepared to include this very different group, from many perspectives, including language, workforce participation, religion, economic status and more.
 Racism and racial discrimination - schools, workplaces, politics, army (especially central to Israeli life), youth groups and other settings are still largely (if unofficially) segregated in Israel, perpetuating racial stereotypes and outright discrimination, with all its consequences - for example, there is a large disparity in the criminal prosecution and imprisonment demographics in Israel.
 The issue of Palestine/occupation, alongside the Mizrahi integration into Israel. "Mizrahi" is a term almost unique to Israel, which is used to include all Jews who came to Israel from Arab or Muslim countries. However, in their countries of origin, Iraqi, Egyptian, Persian, Moroccan, Greek, Azerbaijani, Turkish and other Jewish groups, from entirely disparate countries and continents, did not necessarily share language, culture or tradition. In the Israeli "melting pot", they began to share a common fate, however - as inferior subjects, brought to Israel to do "dirty work" and help the newly-formed Zionist country win the demographic war against the Arabs. Mizrahi immigrants where therefore intentionally placed as a bulwark against Arab invasion from Jordan/the West Bank, with the double purpose of keeping them away from the Ashkenazi city centers. Mizrahi youth have also been placed at the center of the conflict, as they are channeled into combat infantry units in Israel's military, placing them as the front line and the face of the occupation. So while they are oppressed vis-a-vis the Ashkenzi hegemony, they are the oppressors of occupied Palestinians. For the women, the military conflict is around the roles played by husbands and sons, including ramifications such as persistent PTSD - all the while they themselves are still viewed as inferior in the wider society and their earning power is reduced. The pitting of two oppressed groups against each other to the benefit of the oppressor of them both is a recognized pattern in liberation theory.

Inspirations 
Mizrahi feminism draws a great deal of its inspiration from Black feminism, which seeks to abandon the universal white feminist perspective. Whereas white feminism attempts to create a universal female identity, African-American feminism posits that African-American women have a different agenda than white women, which stems from a different life story: a life story consisting of exclusion, marginalization, and social and cultural transparency. And that therefore, black women must recognize that they cannot view the entire feminist agenda through affiliation and belonging to the hegemonic social category (i.e., whites), and to ignore the existence of other categories of transparent and excluded women.

See also 
 Mizrahi Jews
 Haifa Women's Coalition
 Ahoti – for Women in Israel
 Feminism in Israel
 Women in Israel
 Jewish feminism

Further reading 
 Lavie, Smadar. Wrapped in the Flag of Israel: Mizrahi Single Mothers and Bureaucratic Torture. Lincoln: University of Nebraska Press, 2018.
Lavie, Smadar. (2011). Mizrahi Feminism and the Question of Palestine. Journal of Middle East Women's Studies. 7. 56-88.
 Lavie, Smadar. (2010). Mizrahi Feminism and the Question of Palestine. Sedek (Crack, Heb.): A Hebrew Nakba Periodical [translated from English] 5:119-134. 
Dahan-Kalev, Henriette. Breaking Their Silence: Mizrahi Women and the Israeli Feminist Movement.
 Henriette Dahan Kalev, Tensions in Israeli Feminism: The Mizrahi-Ashkenazi Rift, Women's Studies International Forum, 24 (2001), 1–16. 
 Breaking the Pattern and Creating New Paths – Feminist Mizrahi Women Artists in Israel, Tal Dekel, Instituto de História da Arte - Faculdade de Ciências Sociais e Humanas/NOVA, 2015

References

External links 
 INTRA-JEWISH DISCRIMINATION IN ISRAEL: A MIZRAHI FEMINISM CUT AND PASTE PRIMER, Michael Quinones, Context: Politics & Policy, September 24, 2014 
 Israeli and Palestinian Feminisms: Postcolonial Issues, Élisabeth Marteu, Cairn International
 What is a Middle Eastern Feminist Movement: Feminist Movements in Lebanon and Israel, Faith Alexandra Perkins
 Black in Women, Henriette Dahan Kalev, Coalition of Women for Peace

 
Feminist movements and ideologies
Feminism in Israel